Balfour is a town in Raymond Mhlaba Municipality, Amathole District Municipality, in the Eastern Cape province of South Africa.

The village, which lies at the foot of the Katberg, was established as a mission station of the Glasgow Missionary Society in 1828 by John Ross and McDiarmid, and named after Robert Balfour, first Secretary of the Society.

Throughout the nine Frontier Wars, the town experienced some heavy fighting. Today, tobacco, citrus, wool and beef farming are practised in the area.

References

Populated places in the Raymond Mhlaba Local Municipality